Cheltenham Town Ladies Football Club currently plays in the FA Women's National League South.
Cheltenham completed the 2021/22 League and Cup double this season by winning FA Women's National League Division One South West and Gloucester Women's Trophy  earning promotion  to FA Women's National League Southern Division.

Manager Tom Davies also scooped The FA Women's National League Division One West "Manager of the Year 2022/21" after previously winning December's Tier 4 Manager of the Month.

Their football ground is The Corinium Stadium, in Cirencester.

History 
The club was formed in 1989 as 'Cheltenham YMCA'. They started out in the South West Combination League, but their first team was eventually promoted to the FA Women's Premier League in the 2013/14 season.

During the 2016/17 season, Cheltenham won the GFA County Cup in a 5-4 penalty shootout against St Nicholas Ladies Football Club. They later won the GFA Cup again during the 2018/19 season, with a 10–0 victory over Frampton Rangers Football club. This was also the season in which they were nominated for FA WNL Club of the year.

Records 
 Best League Position: 1st in the FA Women's National League, Division One South West, 2021–22 
 FA Cup: Third Round, 2008-09 & 2020-21
 FA WNL Plate: Semi-Final, 2021–22
 Gloucester Women’s Trophy: Winners, 2016–17, 2018-19 & 2021-22 
 Highest Appearances: Rebecca Panniers (91)
 Top Goalscorer: Annie Martin (46)

Club Officials 

 Chairman: Andy Liddle
 Vice Chairperson: Vacant
 Club Secretary: Sammy Hallsworth
 Treasurer: Hannah Britton
 Welfare Officer: Jackie Canning
 Commercial Manager: Vacant
 Head of Social Media: Kieran Neller

Players

Coaching staff:
 Manager: Tom Davies
 Assistant Manager: Dan Liddiard
 First Team Coach: Richard Wood
 Head of Goalkeeping: James Litherland

Support staff:
 Individual Strength & Conditioning Coach: Matt Branton & Marc Bredenkamp
 Nutritionist: Sean Dixson-Davies
 Head of Medical: Peter McKernan
 Performance Analysts: Roi Gill

References 

Women's football clubs in England